Central School, also known as Bessemer City Elementary School, is a historic school complex located at Bessemer City, Gaston County, North Carolina.  The main school building was built about 1929, and is a two-story, "U"-plan brick building with Collegiate Gothic detailing.  It was rebuilt following a fire in 1942.  Adjacent to the school is the Rustic Revival style, rough cut stone gymnasium built in 1933 with funds provided by the Works Progress Administration.  Other contributing buildings are the Home Economics Building (c. 1938-1939), Classroom Building (c. 1953), and Storage Shed (c. 1953).

It was listed on the National Register of Historic Places in 2008.

References

Works Progress Administration in North Carolina
School buildings on the National Register of Historic Places in North Carolina
Gothic Revival architecture in North Carolina
School buildings completed in 1929
Buildings and structures in Gaston County, North Carolina
National Register of Historic Places in Gaston County, North Carolina
1929 establishments in North Carolina